The Promise is the fourth studio album by American hip hop group Freestyle Fellowship. It was released on Decon in 2011.

In September 2011, Prefix premiered "Step 2 the Side". In November that year, Prefix premiered the music video for "We Are".

Critical reception

Jason Lymangrover of AllMusic gave the album 3 stars out of 5, saying, "futuristic beats by Black Milk, Eligh, Kenny Segal, and Exile provide an updated setting for the dexterous wordplay." Luke Gibson of HipHopDX said, "The end result of The Promise sees a legendary group that can still deliver inspired music." Scott Thill of Wired described it as "a healthy reminder of what hip-hop can do when its rhyme machines boast big brains as well as balls."

Track listing

References

External links
 

2011 albums
Freestyle Fellowship albums
Decon albums
Albums produced by Eligh
Albums produced by Exile (producer)
Albums produced by Kenny Segal
Albums produced by Black Milk